Mutton Island is a small island located approximately 1km off the coast of Galway City, Ireland and is connected by to the mainland with a causeway. The causeway is popular for wedding proposals due to the views from the island. It is home to a sewage treatment plant and light house. No permanent residents live on the island and it is generally only visited by those working on the sewage plant. After treatment the sewage water is pumped out to sea on the same facility

References

Islands of County Galway
Uninhabited islands of Ireland